William Paston may refer to:

William Paston (died 1444) (1378–1444), Justice of the Common Pleas
William Paston, 2nd Earl of Yarmouth (1654–1732), British peer and politician
Sir William Paston, 1st Baronet (1528–1610), English benefactor
William Paston, writer of the Paston Letters

See also
Paston (disambiguation)